Fei Fengji (born August 5, 1982 in Shanghai) is a female Chinese sports shooter, who competed for Team China at the 2008 Summer Olympics.  She came in fourth place.

Records
2006 World Championships - 2nd 25m sporting pistol;
2006 World Cup Germany/Italy - 1st 10m air pistol/25m sporting pistol

References

 http://2008teamchina.olympic.cn/index.php/personview/personsen/4918

1982 births
Living people
ISSF pistol shooters
Olympic shooters of China
Sport shooters from Shanghai
Shooters at the 2008 Summer Olympics
Chinese female sport shooters